Santa Rosa Department may refer to one of two departments in Argentina:

Santa Rosa Department, Catamarca
Santa Rosa Department, Mendoza

See also
Santa Rosa (disambiguation)